Events from the year 1558 in literature.

Events
November 17 – The Elizabethan era begins in England: the Catholic Queen Mary dies and is succeeded by her Protestant half-sister Elizabeth.
unknown dates
Albert V, Duke of Bavaria, sets up in his Munich Residenz a court library that is the predecessor of the Bavarian State Library, with the collection of the late Johann Albrecht Widmannstetter at its core.
Italian exile Pietro Perna sets up his printing press in Basel, Switzerland.

New books

Prose
John Dee – Propaedeumata Aphoristica
Ser Giovanni Fiorentino – Il Pecorone (The Simpleton)
John Knox (published anonymously) – 
Marguerite de Navarre (died 1549) – Heptaméron (Histoires des amans fortunez) (edited by Pierre Boaistuau)
Giambattista della Porta – Magia Naturalis
Thomas Watson –

Drama
Jacques Grévin –

Poetry
See 1558 in poetry

Births
July 11 (baptism) – Robert Greene, English writer (died 1592)
November 3 – Thomas Kyd, English dramatist (died 1594)
Probable year – Thomas Lodge, English writer (died 1625)

Deaths
January 28 – Jacob Micyllus, German writer (born 1503)
May 17 – Francisco de Sá de Miranda, Portuguese poet (born 1481)
August 11 – Justus Menius, German Lutheran theologian (born 1499)
September 5 – Robert Broke, English legal writer (birth date unknown)
October 14 – Mellin de Saint-Gelais, French poet (born c. 1491)

References

Years of the 16th century in literature